The 1969 Montana Grizzlies football team represented the University of Montana in the 1969 NCAA College Division football season as a member of the Big Sky Conference (Big Sky). The Grizzlies were led by third-year head coach Jack Swarthout and played their home games at Dornblaser Field.

In a significant turnaround from the previous year, Montana won all ten games in the regular season (4–0 Big Sky, champions). They met undefeated North Dakota State in the Camellia Bowl in Sacramento in December, but lost 30–3. Released prior to the game, both final polls had NDSU first and Montana second.

Schedule

References

External links
Montana Grizzlies football – 1969 media guide

Montana
Montana Grizzlies football seasons
Big Sky Conference football champion seasons
Montana Grizzlies football